Szymon Szymonowic (in Latin, Simon Simonides; in Armenian, Շիմոն Շիմոնովիչ; also, in Polish, "Szymonowicz" and "Bendoński"; born Lwów, 24 October 1558 – died 5 May 1629, Czarnięcin, near Zamość) was a Polish Renaissance poet. He was known as "the Polish Pindar."

Life

Szymonowic studied in Poland (Lwów, Kraków), France and Belgium. From 1586 he was associated with Grand Hetman and Royal Chancellor Jan Zamoyski, with whom in 1593–1605 he organized the Zamojski Academy.

In 1590 he was elevated to the nobility (szlachta), with Kościesza coat-of-arms.

A humanist fluent in Greek and Latin, Szymonowic wrote in Polish Sielanki (Pastorals, 1614), a work influenced by the pastoral poems of Virgil and Theocritus. He also wrote plays in Latin, e.g., Castus Joseph (1587) and Pentesilea (1614). Szymonowic is considered the last great poet of the Polish Renaissance.

He was acquainted with the Scottish Latinist Thomas Seget of Seton (1569 or 1570–1627).

See also

List of Poles
Polish poetry
List of Polish-language poets

Notes

External links
 Szymonowic's works on Polish Wikisource

1558 births
1629 deaths
16th-century Latin-language writers
17th-century Latin-language writers
Polish male writers
Polish people of Armenian descent
Writers from Lviv
16th-century Polish nobility
Polish poets
17th-century male writers
17th-century Polish nobility